The Baldy Man is a television series starring Gregor Fisher, a Scottish comedian. It was broadcast in two series totalling thirteen episodes on ITV, screening in 1995 and 1998, and produced for Carlton Television by Working Title Films. Both series were also broadcast in full on Russian channel TB6 Moscow.

The character's chief attributes were his comb over hairstyle as well as his bumbling nature and plump figure. The series was produced and directed by Colin Gilbert who worked with Fisher in Scotland's well known situation comedy Rab C. Nesbitt among many others. It was written by Philip Differ who was the script editor on Naked Video. The character first appeared in a series of sketches in the BBC Scotland show Naked Video (1986-1991)

Guest stars
The series featured cameos by a number of well-known performers such as Helen Lederer, Joanna Kirkland, Lionel Blair, Ford Kiernan, Greg Hemphill, Iain Cuthbertson and John Grieve.

Episode list
Series One:

 New Look / Delegate - first broadcast: 13/04/1995
 Keep Fit / Ill - first broadcast: 27/04/1995
 D.I.Y. / Reunion - first broadcast: 16/08/1995
 Tearoom / Pets - first broadcast: 25/08/1995
 Bath / Referee - first broadcast: 30/08/1995
 Hair / Crime - untransmitted in UK, but was shown in Russia

Series Two:

 Mother's Day / Smell - first broadcast: 11/09/1997
 Goldrush / God - first broadcast: 15/10/1997
 Barbecue / China Doll - first broadcast: 22/10/1997
 Chauffeur of the Bride / Back Window - first broadcast: 26/10/1997
 Casualty / Baby Sitting - first broadcast: 25/11/1997
 Jigsaw / Murder - first broadcast: 17/12/1997
 Litter Avenger / Aliens - first broadcast: 24/12/1998

DVD and VHS releases
The complete series has been released on DVD as a two disc boxset in Germany from Pidax Entertainment. However, there as of yet have been no immediate plans so far to release the series onto DVD in Britain. The first two episodes were released on a video entitled Introducing...The Baldy Man on 9 October 1995. There were no further releases of the series, however, advertisements to promote a further 2 VHS releases for episodes 3-6 were featured on the tape.

Endorsements
The character was also the star of a series of humorous television commercials for Hamlet cigars.

References

External links
 
Gregor Fisher filmography from the British Film Institute (includes list of Baldy Man appearances)

ITV sitcoms
Television series by Working Title Television
Television series by ITV Studios
1995 British television series debuts
1998 British television series endings
1990s British sitcoms
Carlton Television
English-language television shows